Sinking may refer to:

 Sinking of a ship; see shipwrecking
 Being submerged
 Sinking (album), a 1996 studio album by The Aloof
 Sinking (behavior), the act of pouring out champagne in the sink
 Sinking (metalworking), a metalworking technique
Sinking (novella), a 1921 novella by Yu Dafu
 "Sinking", a song by No Doubt from the album No Doubt (No Doubt album)
 "Sinking", a song by Jars of Clay from the album Jars of Clay (album)
 Sinking Creek (disambiguation), several creeks
 Well drilling
 Shaft sinking, the process of digging a shaft in shaft mining

See also

 Sink condition (pharmaceutics), a required condition during chemical dissolution tests
 Hsinking, former name of the Chinese city Changchun
 Sink (disambiguation)